Now That's What I Call Music! 62 or Now 62 refers to at least two Now That's What I Call Music! series albums, including:

Now That's What I Call Music! 62 (UK series)
Now That's What I Call Music! 62 (U.S. series)